China Eiko Chow (born 15 April 1974) is a British-born American actress and model.

Life
Chow was born in London to restaurateur Michael Chow and his wife, model/designer Tina Chow. Her paternal grandfather was the Peking Opera's Zhou Xinfang. Her paternal aunt is actress and former "Bond girl" Tsai Chin. Her maternal aunt is the artist Adelle Lutz. Through Lutz's 1987 marriage, her uncle is David Byrne.

Her parents left London for New York in 1980, when she was 5 years old. They then relocated to Los Angeles in 1985. Her mother, who was born in Ohio, was of German and Japanese ancestry and her father is Chinese. She has a younger brother, Maximilian (b. 1978). Her parents divorced in November 1989.

In 1992, Chow's mother Tina died of AIDS. The same year, Chow's father married Eva Chun, a Korean fashion designer and Chow gained a half-sister, Asia Chow (b. 1994). In February 2019, her father married his fourth wife, Vanessa Rano, who is 49 years his junior. Through this marriage, Chow has a half-brother, Phoenix Chow (b. 2019) and half-sister Skye Chow (b. 2021). 

Chow was in a relationship with actor Mark Wahlberg for four years after meeting on the set of the 1998 film The Big Hit. She was in a relationship with English actor and comedian Steve Coogan from 2007 until 2011. She has also been romantically linked to actor Keanu Reeves. Since February 2018, she has been in a relationship with English musician Billy Idol.

Education 
She attended the Lycée Français de Los Angeles. After graduating, she went to Boston University for two years before transferring to Scripps College in Claremont, California, where she graduated with a psychology degree in May 1997. She was the first in her family to graduate from college.

Career
Chow was discovered as a prospective fashion model by Roger Museenden. She spent several years following in her mother's footsteps working as a model for Shiseido cosmetics, Tommy Hilfiger and Calvin Klein.  Her modeling led to her being named one of Harper's Bazaars "It Girls" in 1996 and an appearance in the December 1996 edition of Vogue's "The Next Best-Dressed List".

In 2000, she posed for Maxim and was featured in their gallery, Girls of Maxim. She was ranked No. 22 and No. 54 on the Maxim Hot 100 Women (2000 and 2001, respectively).

Chow made her acting debut in 1998, starring opposite Mark Wahlberg in The Big Hit. In 2004, she appeared in Frankenfish. Three years later, Chow appeared on USA Network's first season of Burn Notice. She was the host and a judge of Bravo's Work of Art: The Next Great Artist, which premiered on 9 June 2010.

Chow provided the voice of Katie Zhan in Grand Theft Auto: San Andreas.

Filmography
The Big Hit (1998)
Head Over Heels (2001)
Spun (2002)
Frankenfish (2004)

Notes

References

External links
 

1974 births
English video game actresses
English people of American descent
English people of Chinese descent
English people of German descent
English people of Japanese descent
English people of Scottish descent
Living people
Actresses from London
Scripps College alumni
English film actresses
English television actresses
Actresses from New York City
American actresses of Chinese descent
American actresses of Japanese descent
American people of German descent
American people of Scottish descent
American film actresses
American television actresses
American video game actresses
American film actors of Asian descent